
Gmina Kościelec is a rural gmina (administrative district) in Koło County, Greater Poland Voivodeship, in west-central Poland.

Villages
Gmina Kościelec contains the villages and settlements of Białków Górny, Białków Kościelny, Dąbrowice, Dąbrowice Częściowe, Daniszew, Dobrów, Gąsiorów, Gozdów, Kościelec, Łęka, Leszcze, Mariampol, Police Mostowe, Police Średnie, Ruszków Drugi, Ruszków Pierwszy, Straszków, Trzęśniew, Trzęśniew Mały, Tury and Waki.

Neighbouring gminas
Gmina Kościelec is bordered by the town of Koło and by the gminas of Brudzew, Dąbie, Koło, Kramsk, Krzymów and Władysławów.

References
Polish official population figures 2006

Koscielec
Koło County